André Geneste (born 24 January 1930) is a French former racing cyclist. He finished in last place in the 1961 Tour de France, where he finished in 75th place. He won he Circuit des Ardennes in 1960.

References

External links
 

1930 births
Living people
French male cyclists
Sportspeople from Reims
Cyclists from Grand Est